Marmagao railway station (Station code: MRH) is a small railway station in South Goa district, Goa. It serves Marmagao city. The station consists of two platforms, which are not well sheltered and lack many facilities, including water and sanitation.

The station was part of the Marmagao and Vasco metre-gauge railway line, which was the main rail line in the state until Konkan Railway was started in 1998. It comes under the jurisdiction of the Hubli division of the South Western Railway zone. There are no trains from the station, as Vasco da Gama railway station serves the purpose and is just  from Marmagao station.

References

Hubli railway division
Railway stations in South Goa district
Mormugao
Railway terminus in India